The Hong Kong University Students' Union (HKUSU) was a students' union founded in 1912 and registered under the Societies Ordinance in Hong Kong. It was the officially recognized undergraduate students' association of the University of Hong Kong until 13 July 2021 after the union's council passed a motion in memorial to a deceased assailant who attacked and severely stabbed a police officer on the street.

History
The Union was established in 1912 when it was first named as the Hong Kong University Union, some two years after the foundation of the University of Hong Kong. The Union was then reorganised and renamed as the Hong Kong University Students' Society after the Second World War in 1945. In 1949, the Union submitted a successful application for becoming a student organisation to the Hong Kong Police, independent from the operation of the University.

Motion of police assailant 

On 7 July 2021, the Council of the Union passed a motion to "[express] its deep sadness at the death of Mr Leung Kin-fai; [offer] its sympathy and condolences to his family and friends; [appreciate] his sacrifice to Hong Kong". The individual mentioned in the motion assaulted a police officer with a knife and then killed himself immediately in Causeway Bay on 1 July 2021, during the 24th anniversary of the handover of Hong Kong. The motion was condemned by the university administrators. The then-chairman of the HKU council, Arthur Li, considered the expulsion of the involved student union council members. On 9 July, members of the student union council publicly retracted the motion and apologised, with all union executive committee members resigned.

Despite the apology and resignation, a chain of aftermath followed. On 13 July, the university issued a statement strongly condemned the act of "blatantly whitewashing violence" and has ceased recognising the role provided by the union on campus and their representation for the member students, subsequently ceased collecting membership fees from the students on behalf of the union. The "Democracy Wall", a public bulletin on campus managed by the union, had all propaganda materials swiftly taken down. On 15 July, the university demanded the union office to be vacated from the Composite Building on campus within 7 days. As Arthur Li had previously expressed his willingness to have the union committee members be investigated for their possible violation of the national security law, the union office was raided by the national security police on 17 July. All Union Council members were on the watch list and told they be intercepted should they attempt to leave Hong Kong. Four members of the Union Council were arrested and charged of advocating terrorism under the national security law in August, only to have bail granted later.

Following this incident, other universities also turned against their respective student unions. Lingnan University, Chinese University of Hong Kong, Polytechnic University, and City University all followed suit and stopped collecting membership fees on behalf of their respective students' unions.

General
The Union serves both undergraduate and postgraduate students and is the only official student organisation serving the undergraduates of the University of Hong Kong. Undergraduates become a Union member automatically. Other students of the University can become a member upon the payment of membership fee.

According to the Constitution, the aims of the Union are:
 To promote the welfare of the student body
 To act as a bridge between the student body and the University authority in furthering the interests of the students and the University as a whole
 To identify the student body with social issues in the interests of the people of Hong Kong
 To represent the student body both tensely and internationally

Structure
The highest authority of the Union is the General Meeting (GM) and General Polling (GP). The quorum for both the General Meeting or General Polling is currently 10% of the full members. The General Meeting is hardly ever called, mostly because it is difficult to find a venue to accommodate many members at the same time. However, General Pollings are held almost every year.

There are currently 122 student societies affiliated to HKUSU. These students' societies and clubs can be categorised into six main groups: Campus media, Faculty and academic societies, Hall students' association, Sports clubs (forming the Sports Association, HKUSU), Cultural clubs (forming the Cultural Association, HKUSU) and Independent clubs (forming the Independent Clubs Association, HKUSU).

Union Council

The second highest authority and highest standing authority of the Union is the Union Council. Its functions are to represent the students of the University in such matters as affect their interests and to afford a recognized means of communication between the general body of the students and the University authorities.

Chairperson
Elected at the first meeting in every session, the Council Chairperson is the presiding member of the Union Council. The Chairperson has to be a Union Councillor of the past session to be elected Chairperson of the current session; if he is also a Union Councillor of the current session, he has to resign from the original representation and the seat will be substituted if necessary.

When any member is in the Chair, he cannot move, second or vote on motions.

Honorary Secretary
Also elected at the first meeting in every session, the Honorary Secretary heads the Union Council Secretariat. There is no specific requirement for seeking to be elected Honorary Secretary, but if he, same as the Chairperson, is a Union Councillor of the current session, he has to resign from the original representation and the seat will be substituted if necessary.

The Honorary Secretary has full right to speak, but he cannot move, second or vote on motions.

Union Executives
An Executive Committee, elected in the way of General Polling, acts as the executive body for HKUSU.

The Union Executives are the forefront members representing HKUSU. The Committee comprising 17 members formulate Union policies and carry out resolutions of the General Meeting and General Polling. As well as this, they carry out daily administrative work of the Union.

The composition is as follows:
President
Vice-President (Internal)
Vice-President (External)
general secretary
Financial Secretary
University Affairs Secretary (two seats)
External Affairs Secretary (two seats)
Student Welfare Secretary
Publications and Publicity Secretary
Social Secretary
Current Affairs Secretary
Administrative Secretary
President of the Sports Association (ex officio)
President of the Cultural Association (ex officio)
President of the Independent Clubs Association (ex officio)

Welfare and internal affairs
HKUSU student activities and service outlets include:

University affairs
The Union acts as a channel between students and the University. Some of the current projects include:

External affairs
HKUSU, as one of the students' unions of the 11 universities in Hong Kong, has been very active in current affairs and student movements.

In 1998, the General Polling of the Union adopted that the Pillar of Shame (國殤之柱) should stay in the University campus permanently. This marked the beginning of a permanent stance that the Chinese Communist Party should be held responsible for the June Fourth massacre in Tiananmen Square in Beijing in 1989. Later in 2009, another General Polling passed stated that the Central People's Government of China should rehabilitate the June Fourth Massacre, and be held responsible for the deaths and casualties during the incident.

In November 2016, students' unions across all major Hong Kong universities, including HKUSU, invited Christopher Patten, former Hong Kong governor, to be the guest of honour in a lecture that held at Loke Yew Hall in the University of Hong Kong.

 Further information: BAHCEP (Beijing And Hong Kong Cultural Exchange Program)

New union building
As part of the construction of the Centennial Campus, the Hsü Long Sing Amenities Centre, where the HKUSU had resided for a number of years, was demolished in 2011. Development of a new Students' Union Building was completed in September 2011. Since the Faculty of Arts, Faculty of Law, and Faculty of Social Sciences has been relocated in the west of the HKU, the new Students' Union Building has become the heart of HKU, where majority of student activities will take place.

Union Choir
The Hong Kong University Students' Union Choir was founded in 1967 and has won a number of student awards since its foundation.

List of union presidents

Notes

References

See also
 HKU pro-vice-chancellor selection controversy
 University of Hong Kong
 Pillar of Shame

External links

HKUSU Official Homepage

Students' Union
Students' unions in Hong Kong
Student organizations established in 1912